Pharax was a town in the borderlands of ancient Isauria and Cilicia, inhabited in Roman and Byzantine times. 

Its site is located near Göktepe, Asiatic Turkey.

References

Populated places in ancient Cilicia
Populated places in ancient Isauria
Former populated places in Turkey
Roman towns and cities in Turkey
History of Karaman Province